Santosh Kumar Roy was an Indian politician from the state of Assam. He was a former Member of Assam Legislative Assembly for Katlicherra. He was the father of Gautam Roy, father in law of Mandira Roy, grandfather of Rahul Roy and grandfather in law of Daisy Roy.

Personal life 
Roy married Shefalika Roy in 1939 and had 5 daughters and one son.

Political career 
In the 1972 Assam Legislative Assembly election, Roy was the Indian National Congress candidate for the constituency of Katlicherra. He received 23988 votes, 54.02% of the total vote. He defeated his nearest independent opponent by 6851 votes. He served until the 1978 Assam Legislative Assembly Election, where the former MLA for Katlicherra, Gourishankar Roy, was instead the Congress candidate for Katlicherra and won the election. His son, Gautam Roy, would later go on to represent the same constituency.

References 

Assam MLAs 1972–1978
Year of death missing
Year of birth missing
Place of death missing
Place of birth missing
Indian National Congress politicians from Assam